Jean-Pierre Willems (born 30 October 1886, date of death unknown) was a Belgian fencer. He competed in the team sabre competition at the 1924 Summer Olympics.

References

External links
 

1886 births
Year of death missing
Belgian male sabre fencers
Olympic fencers of Belgium
Fencers at the 1924 Summer Olympics